Matt Weiss is a retired American soccer goalkeeper who played two seasons with the Dallas Tornado in the North American Soccer League.

Weiss attended Quincy University, playing on the school's soccer team from 1971 to 1974.  During his four seasons with the team, Quincy won the 1971, 1973 and 1974 NAIA national men's soccer championship.  In 2005, Quincy inducted Weiss into its Athletic Hall of Fame.

References

External links
NASL stats

1952 births
American soccer players
Dallas Tornado players
North American Soccer League (1968–1984) players
Living people
Association football goalkeepers